is located in the western portion of Yamanashi Prefecture, Japan. Because the mountain has three peaks, it is also called Hōō Sanzan (鳳凰三山). It is in Minami Alps National Park and is one of the 100 Famous Japanese Mountains.

Outline
Mount Hōō has three peaks:

Mount Hōō is separated from most of the other mountains in the Akaishi range, giving a wider view of the surrounding mountains. Also, most mountains in the range have a reddish-brown color ("Akaishi" means "red stone" in Japanese), but Mount Hōō and Mount Kaikoma are the two exceptions, as they are granite mountains.

History
Metal ore was found in the mountain during the Sengoku period and, by the Edo period, the mountain was exploited for its metals and forest products.

 In 1904, Walter Weston became the first to climb the obelisk on top of Jizōdake.
 On June 1, 1964, this area was  specified to the Minami Alps National Park.
 In 1990, Sumie Tanaka (田中澄江 Tanaka Sumie) completed New Flowers of the 100 Mountains, which featured many of the alpine plants on Mount Hōō.

Geography

Nearby mountains 
Mount Hōō is on the subridge (from Mount Komatsu) of the main ridge line in the northern part of the Akaishi Mountains.

Rivers 
The mountain is the source of the following rivers, each of which flows to the Pacific Ocean.
 Noro River (a tributary of the Fuji River)
 Ōtake River, Kotake River (tributaries of the Tenryū River)

Gallery

References

See also
 100 Famous Japanese Mountains
 Akaishi Mountains
 Minami Alps National Park

Akaishi Mountains
Japan Alps
Hoo, Mount